Kupinik is a village in Serbia. It is situated in the Plandište municipality, in the South Banat District, Vojvodina province. The village has a Serb ethnic majority (95,70%) and its population numbering 349 people (2002 census).

Historical population

1961: 886
1971: 735
1981: 545
1991: 409
2002: 349

References
Slobodan Ćurčić, Broj stanovnika Vojvodine, Novi Sad, 1996.

See also
List of places in Serbia
List of cities, towns and villages in Vojvodina

Populated places in South Banat District
Populated places in Serbian Banat
Plandište